Passion is the third studio album by English singer Geri Halliwell. It was released on 6 June 2005 by Innocent Records. 

Two singles were released from the album: "Ride It", was commercially successful. It peaked at number two in Russia, number four in UK, reaching number three on the Belgium, Spain and Scotland Charts, and reached number one in Ukraine. "Desire", charted at number 22 on the UK Singles Chart. 

Although the album was praised for Halliwell's improved voice the album was a commercial disappointment, peaking at number 41 with only 5,432 copies sold and charting for only one week on the UK Albums Chart. After one year of release sales reach 10,000 sold in UK.

Background
Halliwell wrote many songs between 2001 and 2004 with a number of producers. Songs recorded during this period that did not appear on the final album include "Set Me Off", "Turn It On", "Putting on the Bling", "Disco Sister", and a cover version of "100% Pure Love". Halliwell also wanted to record the track "Some Girls" (written by Richard X and Hannah Robinson) for the album, but the track was instead given to Rachel Stevens.

At the end of 2004, EMI and Halliwell came to a mutual agreement and changed the focus of the album and the title to Passion, replacing some of the dance songs with ballads, jazz, and electropop songs, including the newly recorded songs "Passion", "Desire", "Surrender Your Groove", "So I Give Up on Love", and the B-side "True Love Never Dies".

Halliwell described the album as "a journey through a range of extreme emotions from passion and love through to fear and hope". According to her, Passion can be seen to chart her development as both a vocalist and songwriter. For the singer it has been a matter of "finding out who I am not as much as I what I am. I think this album catches me at a real transitional point as a songwriter".

Promotion
A documentary promoting Passion, titled There's Something About Geri, was premiered by Channel 5 on 15 May 2005. It covered her life and career and following her from Moscow to Milan and Britain as she prepares for a relaunch of her singing career. The documentary attracted an audience of 1.1 million viewers, garnering above-average Sunday ratings for the network. Despite rating success, it was criticised by the media for showing a "self-obsessed, painfully vain little girl in need of constant mollycoddling". She regretted doing the documentary film, commenting, "I shouldn't have done it! Even thinking about it makes me cringe!"

A tour had been planned in order to promote the album, but was cancelled.

Singles
"Ride It" was released on 22 November 2004 by Innocent Records as the first single from the album. "Ride It" was commercially successful. It peaked at number two in Russia, number four in UK, reaching number three on the Belgium, Spain and Scotland Charts. The single reached number one in Ukraine.

The song "Desire" was released on 30 May 2005 as the album's second and final single. It peaked at number 22 on the UK Singles Chart, becoming the lowest-peaking single of Halliwell's solo career to date. To promote the single, Halliwell performed the song on Top of the Pops, Top Gear, CD:UK, The Footy Show, Ministry of Mayhem, Popworld and GMTV.

Track listing

Personnel

Geri Halliwell – vocals
Anders Hedlund – drums
Peter-John Vettese – guitar, backing vocals, drums
Phil Spalding – bass guitar
Magnus Lind – accordion
Putter Smith - double bass 
Andy Duncan – drum programming
Mitch Dalton – acoustic guitar
Joe Holweger – electric guitar, bass guitar
Dave Bishop – baritone saxophone
John Themis – guitar
Matthew Vaughan – keyboards, programming
Damon Wilson – bass guitar
Tim Van Der Kuil – guitar
Guy Chambers – acoustic guitar, baritone guitar, bass guitar
Frank Ricotti – percussion
Sam Dixon – bass guitar
Phil Palmer – acoustic guitar
Richard Robson – programming
Phil Todd – alto saxophone, flute
Dave Arch – piano
Chris Davis – tenor saxophone, flute
Emma Holmgren – backing vocals
Andy Caine – backing vocals
Hannah Robinson – backing vocals
Mitch Stevens – backing vocals
Tracy Ackerman – backing vocals
Claire Worrall – backing vocals
Gary Nuttall – backing vocals

Charts

References

2005 albums
EMI Records albums
Geri Halliwell albums
Innocent Records albums